The Cape Town Highlanders is a reserve mechanised infantry regiment of the South African Army.

History

Origins
Descendants of Scottish immigrants to South Africa raised the Cape Town Highlanders in 1885. On 24 April of the same year, their services were accepted – since then, this date has always been celebrated as the regiment's official birthday.

Bechuanaland Campaign
The regiment first saw active duty during the Bechuanaland Campaign that was fought in the Northern Cape between 1896 and 1897.

Anglo-Boer War
At the outbreak of the Second Anglo-Boer War the regiment was again mobilised for active duty. During the war the regiment or elements thereof took part in several actions, including the relief of Kimberley.

Volunteer era
The Duke of Connaught and Strathearn became colonel-in-chief of the regiment in 1906, and the regiment's name was thus changed to the Duke of Connaught and Strathearn's Own Cape Town Highlanders.

With the Union Defence Force
When the regiment was embodied in the Union Defence Force (UDF) Citizen Force in 1913, the title was changed to 6th Infantry (Duke of Connaught and Strathearn's Own Cape Town Highlanders).

World War 1
During World War I the Cape Town Highlanders first fought against Germany in German South-West Africa, but was subsequently combined with the Transvaal Scottish Regiment to form the 4th South African Infantry (South African Scottish) Regiment, part of the 1st South African Brigade. (The South African Scottish, like various similar units, was formed by the South African government since a clause in the Defence Act of that time prohibited existing units from serving so far outside the country's borders.) After fighting in the Senussi Campaign in North Africa the brigade was shipped to France, where it took part in many battles between 1916 and 1918, including the famous Battle of Delville Wood. During its time on the Western Front, the South African Brigade and its Scottish heritage 4th Battalion, first served a lengthy stint with the British 9th (Scottish) Division, and following the Brigade's decimation in March 1918, was reconstituted and incorporated in September into the 66th (2nd East Lancashire) Division until the end of the war.

The title was changed again, in 1932, to Cape Town Highlanders (Duke of Connaught and Strathearn's Own).

World War 2
At the outbreak of World War II in 1939 the regiment was again mobilised. However, it did not fight in the first campaign of the South African Army in the war, the Abyssinian campaign of 1940 to 1941. However, in mid-1941, the regiment was briefly sent to Egypt to escort thousands of Italian prisoners of war to internment camps in South Africa; it returned to Egypt in late June of the same year to join the newly arrived South African 1st Infantry Division in the Western Desert.

The Cape Town Highlanders fought in all of the major battles of the Western Desert campaign, including the Battle of El Alamein. Indeed, the regiment is one of only three in the world (all of them South African) to have not only the usual two Alamein battle honours – "Alamein Defence" and "El Alamein" – but a third, "Alamein Box", which resulted from a separate action during the initial defence. This action played a significant role in halting Rommel's advance on the tired and depleted British Eighth Army.

During the regiment's subsequent deployment to Italy, the regiment was temporarily combined with South Africa's senior Scottish unit, the First City Regiment, to form the First City/Cape Town Highlanders. This combined unit fought from Battle of Monte Cassino to the Alps, culminating in the heroic capture at bayonet-point of the strategic peak of Monte Sole as part of the South African 6th Armoured Division.

In 1947, Queen Elizabeth (later Queen Elizabeth the Queen Mother) was appointed colonel-in-chief, and from 1948 until South Africa became a republic in 1961, the regiment was the Queen's Own Cape Town Highlanders.

With the SADF

Border War
The first significant post-war action of the Cape Town Highlanders took place in January 1976, during Operation Savannah. This was the first large-scale incursion by the South African Defence Force (SADF) into Angola during the 23-year-long "Border War" in South-West Africa (now Namibia). During the following years the regiment was mobilised several times, including for Operation Prone and others. The last mobilisation during this period occurred in October 1988.

With the SANDF
The regiment was mobilised in April 1994 as part of the efforts by the South African National Defence Force to ensure a peaceful first fully democratic election.

As a result of the subsequent abolition of conscription and the transformation of the South African Army, the Cape Town Highlanders Regiment returned to its original form of a volunteer regiment.

In 2000 a contingent of the Cape Town Highlanders attended the Queen Mother's 100th birthday and paraded the regiment's Colour on Horse Guards Parade. The Drums and Pipes participated in a special parade centenary for the Queen Mother in Edinburgh, and carried on to participate in the Edinburgh Military Tattoo. With the death of the Queen Mother in 2002, the regiment sent a contingent to participate in her funeral procession. The Drums and Pipes have since performed regularly at the Edinburgh Military Tattoo (2002, 2004, 2006, 2009 and 2012). In 2006, they were invited, together with the Queensland Police Pipe Band and 4 bands from the new Royal Regiment of Scotland to perform at Balmoral Castle for the Royal Family. The Band has also participated in the Basel Tattoo, The Berlin Military Tattoo, Jinhae (South Korea) and at the Cape Town Tattoo, held in the Castle of Good Hope.

Name Change
In August 2019, it was announced that 52 South African Army Reserve units would have their names changed to reflect the diverse military history of South Africa. The Cape Town Highlanders was due to be known as the Gonnema Regiment, and along with units undergoing name changes had 3 years from the announcement in August 2019 to design and implement new regimental insignia. In an announcement by the SANDF's Directorate Defence Corporate Communication in June 2022 regarding name changes of South African Army Reserve units in Cape Town, it was confirmed that the unit has not officially changed its name and remains known as the Cape Town Highlanders.

Current Capability
The regiment is currently a mechanised infantry regiment in the SANDF and has sent members as part of the Peace keeping contingent to the Democratic Republic of the Congo (DRC) and Burundi. It has also taken part in internal deployments in support of the police as well as protecting the border.

The weekend of 24 April 2015 saw the 130 year anniversary of the Cape Town Highlander's creation, marked by regimental celebration dinners, the exercising of the unit's right to the Freedom of the City in Cape Town, as well as a medal and church parade.

Until 1967 the Regiment served as a de facto guard of honour battalion as well in imitation of the Foot Guards of the British Army.

Regimental symbols
Regimental tartan: The Gordon regimental tartan from the clan Gordon as previously worn by The Gordon Highlanders; it is the only regiment in the world to wear the kilt in this tartan.
Regimental mottos: The regiment has two mottos. The first, "Nemo Me Impune Lacessit", is in Latin and means "No Man Challenges me with Impunity"; it is used by several Scottish regiments. The second, "Bydand", is in Doric and means "Steadfast". This motto was unique to The Gordon Highlanders and the Cape Town Highlanders. However, with the amalgamation of The Gordon Highlanders with other Scottish units, this motto has fallen into disuse by them; the Cape Town Highlanders still uses it on a shield that also bears a stag's head which is worn on the ceremonial sporran by those with the rank of corporal and below.
Regimental quick march: The regimental quick march is "Cock o' the North"; it was also the march of The Gordon Highlanders and commemorates the Marquess of Huntly, son of the Duke of Gordon, whose nickname was the "Cock o' The North".

Dress Insignia

During WW1 the Union Defence Force established the 4th Infantry Regiment which was unique in that it was the South African Scottish, raised from the Transvaal Scottish and the Cape Town Highlanders, and wearing the Atholl Murray tartan.  This regiment's collar badges were identical to those of the Cape Town Highlanders but bore the Latin motto "Mors Lucrum Mihi" (Death is my reward) in place of the usual Cape Town Highlander wording.  (Death is my Reward), was the family motto of the first Officer Commanding SA Scottish, a Lieutenant-Colonel F.A. Jones.

Customs 
The unit wears black instead of brown boots a mark of mourning for a Scottish soldier, Major-General Sir John Moore, Commander of the Highland Brigade
 
Two types of headgear, the khaki Balmoral bonnet and the Glengarry, which is blue with red-and-white dicing. The Balmoral is worn during daytime as a general working headdress, regardless of the order of dress being worn or whether the wearer is in barracks or in the field, although in the latter case it is sometimes replaced by a bush-hat or helmet.
The glengarry is worn for walking out; on ceremonial, mess and social occasions; and after Retreat has been sounded at 18h00.
 
Officers carry an ash-plant walking stick on all occasions except mess and other formal functions; or when armed with a claymore or rifle.
 
Non-commissioned officers are entitled to carry a "swagger stick" as a mark of their important status in the regiment.
  
No officer or NCO may eat before his men have eaten.

Alliances
 – The Highlanders
 – The Royal Victoria Regiment

Battle honours

Awarded

The Cape Town Highlanders Regiment has the following battle honours on its regimental colours:
Bechuanaland 1896–97, *South Africa 1899–1902, South West Africa 1915, Gazala, Alem Hamza, Best Post, Alamein Box, Alamein Defence. Alem el Halfa, Battle of El Alamein, Western Desert 1941–43, Cassino II, Paliano, Chiusi, Florence, Gothic Line, The Greve, Monte Stanco, Monte Pezza, Sole/Caprara, Po Valley, Italy 1944–45

The "Lost" colours
The South African Union Defence Act of 1914 prohibited the deployment of South African troops beyond the borders of the South Africa and its immediate neighbouring territories. To send troops to Europe to support the Commonwealth in World War I, Generals Botha and Smuts created the South African Overseas Expeditionary Force. However, because of the limitations of the Defence Act, they issued a General Order (Order 672 of 1915) which stated that The South African Overseas Expeditionary Force will be Imperial and have the status of regular British Troops. "Status" was meant to imply administrative purposes, as Britain was paying for the maintenance of the force in the field for the sake of local political sensitivities.

On 8 June 1916 the Adjutant General's office at Defence Headquarters issued a note stating:

As such, the below colours were awarded to the Unit, but because of the unit being an "Imperial Unit" at the stage of award, the right to bear the colours lapsed at the end of hostilities.

The fifteen "missing" battle honours awarded for service in France and Flanders to the 4th South African Infantry (South African Scottish) battalion include some of the most famous in South Africa's military history:

Egypt 1916, Somme 1916, Delville Wood, Arras 1917, Ypres 1917, Menin Road, Messines 1918, Hindenburg Line, Cambrai 1918, Pursuit to Mons, France and Flanders 1918, Le Transloy, Scarpe 1917, Kemmel, Lys

Leadership

Notes

References

External links
 Cape Town Highlanders Website

Highland regiments
Infantry regiments of South Africa
Military history of South Africa
Military units and formations in Cape Town
Military units and formations established in 1885
Military units and formations of the Second Boer War
Military units and formations of the British Empire
Military units and formations of South Africa in World War I
Military units and formations of South Africa in World War II
Military units and formations of South Africa in the Border War
Pages with Battle Honours